Kenneth R. Battle (born October 10, 1964) is an American former professional basketball player.

High school career
In 1984, Battle led Aurora West High School to third place in the Illinois High School Association Class AA state basketball tournament. Battle led the tournament with 86 points in four games for third-place finisher Aurora West.

In 2007, the Illinois High School Association named Battle one of the 100 Legends of the IHSA Boys Basketball Tournament.

College career
Battle played collegiately at Northern Illinois University from 1984–1986 before transferring to the University of Illinois. He was known as "King of the 360s" while playing at Northern Illinois. He was the captain of the 1989 Illinois team nicknamed the Flyin' Illini. The team reached the Final Four before being topped by Michigan. Battle was a fan favorite due to his hustle and spectacular slam dunks. The Illini awards the Kenny Battle Inspirational Award to the player who shows the most hustle during the season.

Professional career
Battle was selected by the Detroit Pistons in the 1st round (27th overall) of the 1989 NBA Draft and then traded on draft day to the Phoenix Suns along with Micheal Williams in exchange for the Suns' first round draft choice (24th overall pick), Anthony Cook. Battle played in 4 NBA seasons for the Phoenix Suns, Denver Nuggets, Boston Celtics and Golden State Warriors. His best year as a pro came during the 1991-92 NBA season when he split time with the Suns and Nuggets, appearing in 56 games and averaging 6.1 ppg. However, Battle's best game as a pro came on November 10, 1990 when he scored 23 points on 8/14 shooting in a Suns 173 – 143 victory over the Nuggets. Prior to that, he competed in the 1990 NBA Slam Dunk Contest, where he finished in last place (8th). Battle briefly joined the Fargo-Moorhead Beez of the International Basketball Association in 2000. Currently Kenny is the director of basketball at Camp Judaea in Hendersonville, North Carolina.

Honors

Basketball
 1985–96 – NABC National Dunker of the Year
 1985 – 2nd Team All-Mid-American Conference
 1985 – Mid-American Conference Freshman of the Year
 1985 – Honorable Mention All American
 1986 – Youngest player in MAC History to Reach 1,000 Career Points.
 1986 – 1st Team All-Mid-American Conference
 1986 – Honorable Mention All American
 1987 – Illini Co-MVP
 1988 – 3rd Team All-Big Ten
 1988 – Honorable Mention All American
 1989 – Team Co-Captain
 1989 – Preseason Wooden Award Nominee
 1989 – 2nd Team All-Big Ten
 1989 – Honorable Mention All American
 1989 – NCAA All-Regional Team
 1989 – Kenny Battle Leadership Award
 1996 – Inducted into the Illinois Basketball Coaches Association's Hall of Fame as a player.
 2000 – Named to the Northern Illinois University All-Century Team.
 2004 – Elected to the "Illini Men's Basketball All-Century Team".
 2008 – Honored as one of the thirty-three honored jerseys which hang in the State Farm Center to show regard for being the most decorated basketball players in the University of Illinois' history.

College statistics

Northern Illinois University

* All-time Single Season Record in Northern Illinois University history

University of Illinois

* All-time Single Season Record in University of Illinois history

Combined college statistics

NBA career statistics

Regular season

Playoffs

References

External links
Kenny Battle profile, basketball-reference.com

1964 births
Living people
African-American basketball players
American men's basketball players
Basketball players from Illinois
Boston Celtics players
Case Western Reserve University School of Law alumni
Denver Nuggets players
Detroit Pistons draft picks
Golden State Warriors players
Harlem Globetrotters players
Illinois Fighting Illini men's basketball players
La Crosse Catbirds players
Northern Illinois Huskies men's basketball players
Phoenix Suns players
Quad City Thunder players
Small forwards
Sportspeople from Aurora, Illinois
American expatriate basketball people in the Philippines
Alaska Aces (PBA) players
Philippine Basketball Association imports
21st-century African-American people
20th-century African-American sportspeople